Judolia swainei is a species of beetle in the family Cerambycidae. It was described by Hopping in 1922.

References

S
Beetles described in 1922